The Stits-Besler Executive is a three place homebuilt aircraft designed by Ray Stits, as the Stits SA-4A Executive.

Development
The project was initiated when William Besler of Besler Corp. contracted Ray Stits to design a three-place homebuilt aircraft with folding wings. Besler was an early aviation experimenter, who had mounted a steam engine of his own design on a Travel Air 2000 in 1933.

Design
The wings on the Executive fold aft and upward. Fuel tanks are embedded in the non-folding wing roots. The fuselage is welded steel tube with fabric covering. The ailerons are mounted in the center of the wing rather than the tips.

Operational history
The sole Executive, (registration no.

Specifications (Stits-Besler Executive)

See also

Notes

References

External links

1000 aircraft photos
aerofiles

Homebuilt aircraft
Aircraft first flown in 1955
Low-wing aircraft
Single-engined tractor aircraft
Conventional landing gear
1950s United States sport aircraft